Northern Ireland is the smallest of the four components of the United Kingdom in terms of both area and population, containing 2.9% of the total population and 5.7% of the total area of the United Kingdom. It is the smaller of the two political entities on the island of Ireland by area and population, the other being the Republic of Ireland. Northern Ireland contains 27.1% of the total population and 16.75% of the total area of the island of Ireland.

Northern Ireland has a population of 1,903,175, an increase of 92,312 (5.1%) over the ten-year period since the last census. The population density is 133 people per km2, less than half that of Great Britain but almost twice that of the Republic of Ireland. The Belfast Metropolitan Area dominates in population terms, with over a third of the inhabitants of Northern Ireland.

When Northern Ireland was created, it had a Protestant majority of approximately two-to-one, unlike the Republic of Ireland, where Catholics were in the majority. The 2001 census was the first to show that the Protestant and other (non-Catholic) Christian share of the population had dropped below 50%, but 53.1% still identified as being from a Protestant or other Christian background. In the 2011 census, this dropped to 48.4%. In 2021, the number of Catholics by background (45.7%) overtook the Protestant and other Christian by background share (43.48%), becoming the plurality, with no group in the overall majority.

Its people speak both Irish and dialects of English heavily influenced by the Scots language. This is both because of historic links with Scotland going back centuries, and because of settlements of lowland Scots Protestants in Ulster in the 17th century, such as the Plantation of Ulster. Also unlike the Republic, a large proportion of people in Northern Ireland have a British national identity. Many people in Northern Ireland have a Northern Irish identity, whether in addition to a British or Irish identity or by itself. Most people in Northern Ireland are entitled to both British and Irish passports.

Historic population trends

Fertility

Place of birth

In 2001, 91.0% of the population were born in Northern Ireland, 7.2% were born in other parts of the UK and Ireland, and 1.8% were born elsewhere. By 2011, the proportion of immigrants from outside the UK and Ireland had risen to 4.3%, while the proportion born within them (outside Northern Ireland) had fallen to 6.7%. The highest number of non-British/Irish immigrants are in Belfast, followed by Craigavon Urban Area and Dungannon. Dungannon has a bigger share of immigrants than any town in Northern Ireland, while Strabane has the smallest share of these immigrants.

Age bands broken down by place of birth in the 2011 census.

Below are the 5 largest foreign-born groups in Northern Ireland according to 2014 ONS estimates.

Ethnicity

The following table shows the ethnic group of respondents for the following censuses

Languages spoken

English is by far the most commonly spoken language in Northern Ireland. Two regional languages of Northern Ireland, Irish and Ulster Scots, are protected under the European Charter for Regional or Minority Languages. Several other languages are spoken by immigrants to Northern Ireland, the most common of which is Polish.

A question about knowledge of Irish was reintroduced to the census in 1991, for the first time since 1911. In 2011, the census question was modified to ask about Ulster Scots alongside Irish. 

Main language of all usual residents aged 3 and over

Ability in Irish of all usual residents aged 3 and over in the Census

Ability in Ulster Scots of all usual residents aged 3 and over in the Census

Religion

For the first century that Northern Ireland existed, the majority or plurality of its population identified with Protestantism, and with its founding, the region was intended to have a permanent Protestant majority. With the 2021 census, Catholics outnumbered Protestants for the first time. The following table shows the religion stated by respondents to the 2001, 2011 and 2021 censuses.

The religious affiliations in the districts of Northern Ireland at the time of the 2011 census were as follows. Note that these boundaries changed in 2015.

Religions broken down by place of birth in the 2011 census.

The religious affiliations in the different age bands in the 2011 census were as follows:

National identity

In Northern Ireland national identity is complex. Many in Northern Ireland have a British national identity and view the English, Scots and Welsh as fellow members of their common nation while regarding people from the Republic of Ireland as foreigners. Many others in Northern Ireland view people from the Republic of Ireland as being members of their common nation encompassing the island of Ireland and regard the English, Scots and Welsh as foreigners. Co-existing with this dichotomy is a Northern Irish identity, which can be held alone or, as is also the case with Englishness, Scottishness and Welshness, alongside a British identity, or alongside an Irish identity. A small number of people see themselves as being both British and Irish.

Although there is a strong correlation between religion and national identity, Catholics tending to identify as Irish and Protestants tending to identify as British, this is not an absolute relationship, and the correlation is much weaker amongst Catholics than it is amongst Protestants. Amongst Catholics, geography also plays an important role, with Catholics in heavily Protestant parts of Northern Ireland being more likely to call themselves British and less likely to call themselves Irish than Catholics in more Catholic areas of Northern Ireland. (The reverse is true for Protestants, but to a lesser extent.) In the 2011 census there were four of the twenty-six districts of Northern Ireland, all on the east coast, where more Catholics considered themselves British than considered themselves Irish.

While in the 2011 census Protestants outnumbered Catholics in only half of the districts in Northern Ireland, those who considered themselves British outnumbered those who considered themselves Irish in twenty of the twenty-six districts in Northern Ireland. This is partly because Catholics were more likely to see themselves as British than Protestants were to see themselves as Irish (13% vs. 4% respectively), but is also partly because those of no religion were substantially more likely to see themselves as British as see themselves as Irish. The irreligious tend to live in Protestant areas, suggesting that they are mostly of Protestant descent. Members of the immigrant population, which includes many Poles, are also more likely to consider themselves Catholic.

Northern Irish identity was almost equally held amongst Protestants as amongst Catholics, and it varied little according to geography.

In the 2021 census respondents gave their national identity as follows.

National identity by religion (2011)

Detail by religion (2011)

National identity by age (2011)

National identity by district (2011)

National identity by religion or religion brought up in for each district (2011)

National identity by place of birth (2011)

National identity by ethnic group (2011)

Passports held

Those born in Northern Ireland have automatic British citizenship on the same basis and with the same provisos as those born elsewhere in the United Kingdom. As well as this, and despite the withdrawal of its constitutional claim to Northern Ireland in 1999, the Irish Government also grants the right to Irish citizenship to those born in Northern Ireland on the same basis and with the same provisos as those born within the Republic of Ireland. This means that most people in Northern Ireland are entitled to a British passport, an Irish passport, or both, as they so choose. By agreement between the Irish Government and Post Office Ltd, post offices in Northern Ireland provide a service whereby customers can apply for an Irish passport, operating alongside their service whereby customers can apply for a British passport. In the 2011 census, respondents stated that they held the following passports.

Age
According to the Northern Ireland Statistics and Research Authority the average (median) age increased from 34 years to 37 years between the 2001 and 2011 censuses. Over the same period, the share of the population represented by children aged under 16 years fell from 24 per cent to 21 per cent, while the proportion of people aged 65 years and over rose from 13 per cent to 15 per cent.

Summary of vital statistics since 1900

Current vital statistics

Other statistics

Life expectancy at birth:
Men: 77.2 years
Women: 80.8 years

Infant mortality rate:
6.4 deaths/1,000 live births (1999)

Total Period Fertility Rate (TPFR):
2.06 children born/woman (2011)

HIV/AIDS prevalence rate:
0.024% (2005 est.)

People living with HIV/AIDS:
408 (2005)

See also
Demographics of the Republic of Ireland
Demography of the United Kingdom
Demography of England
Demography of Scotland
Demography of Wales
Politics of Northern Ireland

References

Further reading